Sargis Karapetyan may refer to:
Sargis Karapetyan (footballer, born 1963), Armenian footballer
Sargis Karapetyan (footballer, born 1990), Armenian footballer